Mateo Ignacio Maccari (born 29 December 2000) is an Argentine professional footballer who plays as a central midfielder for Newell's Old Boys.

Career
Maccari came through the youth ranks at Newell's Old Boys. He made the breakthrough into first-team football under manager Frank Darío Kudelka in mid-2020, initially as an unused substitute for Copa de la Liga Profesional matches with Talleres and Boca Juniors. Maccari made his senior debut in the same competition on 14 November, featuring for the final moments of a victory away to Lanús.

Career statistics
.

Notes

References

External links

2000 births
Living people
Footballers from Rosario, Santa Fe
Argentine footballers
Association football midfielders
Newell's Old Boys footballers